Anthony Dewitt Bell (born July 2, 1964) is a retired American football linebacker who played for the St. Louis Cardinals of the NFL. He played at Michigan State University and then was drafted in the first-round of the 1986 NFL Draft by the St. Louis Cardinals as the first linebacker selected in that year's draft under new Cardinals coach Gene Stallings.

While enrolled at Michigan State University in 1986, Bell was selected to receive the Chester Brewer Leadership Award which is presented to "a graduating senior for distinguished performance in athletics and scholarship, and for possessing a high degree of leadership qualities and skill."

After playing for the St. Louis/Phoenix Cardinals, Detroit Lions, and the Los Angeles Raiders, he was released in 1992 as a free agent. He played in the 1995 season for the Ottawa Rough Riders of the CFL, and retired soon thereafter.

References

1964 births
American football linebackers
Michigan State Spartans football players
St. Louis Cardinals (football) players
Phoenix Cardinals players
Detroit Lions players
Los Angeles Raiders players
Ottawa Rough Riders players
Living people